Lucas Gonçalves da Silva (born 14 October 1981) is a Brazilian football manager. He is the current assistant manager of Atlético Mineiro.

Career
Born in Porto Alegre, Rio Grande do Sul, Gonçalves graduated in Physical Education at the Universidade Luterana do Brasil in 2004, and was appointed manager of Grêmio's under-11 squad in the following year. He left the club in 2010, after managing the under-13s and under-15s, and was named assistant manager of Porto Alegre's under-17 team.

On 13 December 2010, Gonçalves was appointed Luís Antônio Zaluar's assistant at Cabofriense. After another year back at Porto Alegre, he returned to Grêmio in 2012, now as manager of the under-20s.

In August 2016, after being an assistant at Tombense and Atlético Tubarão, Gonçalves was named analyst at Atlético Mineiro. In 2018, while Thiago Larghi was the interim manager, he was his assistant.

After a short period at Paraná, Gonçalves returned to Galo in 2019, again as analyst. He became the permanent assistant manager of the first team in the 2020 season, after James Freitas left, and was named interim manager on 26 February 2021, after the departure of Jorge Sampaoli.

Personal life
Gonçalves' father Otacílio Gonçalves was also a football manager.

References

External links
 

1981 births
Living people
Sportspeople from Porto Alegre
Brazilian football managers
Campeonato Brasileiro Série A managers
Clube Atlético Mineiro managers